Thomas Raymond Flores (born March 21, 1937) is an American former professional football player and coach in the National Football League (NFL). He played as a quarterback for nine seasons in the NFL, primarily with the Oakland Raiders. After his retirement as a coach, he was a radio announcer for more than twenty years.

Flores won a total of four Super Bowls in his playing and coaching careers. He and Mike Ditka are the only two people in NFL history to win a Super Bowl as a player, assistant coach, and head coach (Flores won Super Bowl IV as a player for the Kansas City Chiefs, Super Bowl XI as an assistant coach of the Raiders, and Super Bowl XV and Super Bowl XVIII as head coach of the Raiders).  Flores was also the first Mexican starting quarterback and the first minority head coach in professional football history to win a Super Bowl. Although it may not be officially sourced, Flores is also noted as the only head coach to win a Super Bowl with the same team in two cities in Oakland (1980) and Los Angeles (1983). 

From 1997 until 2018, Flores served as radio announcer for the Raiders Radio Network. Flores was elected to the Pro Football Hall of Fame in 2021.

Playing career
Flores played quarterback for two seasons at Fresno City College, beginning in 1955.  He was active off the field too, serving on the Student Council and as President of the Associated Men's Students.  He received an academic scholarship to study at the College (now University) of the Pacific and graduated from the University of the Pacific in 1958. Flores came to Pacific from Fresno City College and started for the Tigers as quarterback. Following his playing career with the Tigers, he was hired as an assistant coach at Pacific and worked toward his master's degree. 

Flores was unable to find a job in professional football.  He was cut by the Calgary Stampeders of the CFL in 1958, after which he played with the Bakersfield Spoilers (Semi-Pro) football team (Source: Fire in the Iceman, autobiography written by Tom Flores and Frank Cooney, 1992). A second attempt to break into pro football with the Washington Redskins of the National Football League (NFL) in 1959 also failed.  In 1960, Flores finally landed a position as a quarterback with the American Football League's Oakland Raiders, who began play in 1960 as a charter member of the league.  He was named the Raiders' starter early that season, becoming the first-ever Hispanic starting quarterback in professional football.

Flores had his most productive season in 1966. Although he completed only 49.3 percent of his attempts, he passed for 2,638 yards and 24 touchdowns in 14 games.  Oakland traded him to the Buffalo Bills in 1967.  After serving as Jack Kemp's backup that year, he had a chance to be the Bills' starter when Kemp suffered a season-ending injury during training camp. However, Flores hurt his shoulder before the first game, and his season was limited to a five-pass appearance in Week 6. After another five-pass appearance in the first game of 1969, the Bills released Flores and he signed with the Kansas City Chiefs. There he was third-string quarterback behind fellow Hall of Famer Len Dawson and Mike Livingston on the Chiefs' Super Bowl Championship team.  He officially retired as a player after not playing a single game in the 1970 season.  He was one of only twenty players who were in the AFL for its entire ten-year existence.  He is the fifth-leading passer in the AFL's history.

Coaching career
Flores is a member of the Sid Gillman coaching tree. After stints as an assistant coach in Buffalo and Oakland (he won a Super Bowl XI ring as an assistant coach under John Madden), Flores became the Raiders' head coach in 1979, following Madden's retirement. In 1980, Flores led the Raiders as a wild card playoff team to win the Super Bowl XV championship over the Philadelphia Eagles, 27-10. This was the first wild card team to win the Super Bowl and the only team to win four postseason games en route to a title, until Denver accomplished the same feat in 1997. Flores then moved with the team to Los Angeles in 1982. In the 1983 season Flores lead the Raiders to another Super Bowl (XVIII) victory over the Washington Redskins, 38-9. He was named AFC Coach of the year by United Press International and the Football Writer's Association in 1982.

Flores was the NFL's first minority head coach to win a Super Bowl, winning twice – Super Bowl XV with the Oakland Raiders and Super Bowl XVIII with the Los Angeles Raiders.

After a 5–10 finish to the 1987 season, Flores moved to the Raiders' front office, but left after just one year to become the president and general manager of the Seattle Seahawks. He returned to coaching as the Seahawks head coach in 1992, but was fired after the 1994 season following three disappointing seasons.

His 83 wins with the Raiders are the second-most in franchise history, behind only Madden. Flores left pro football with a lifetime coaching record of 97–87 (52.7%), as well as an 8–3 playoff record, with two Super Bowl victories.

Head coaching record

Post-coaching career
From 1997 until his dismissal in 2018, Flores served as color commentator alongside play-by-play announcer Greg Papa for the Raiders Radio Network.

Flores served as coach of the American team in the 2011 NFLPA Collegiate Bowl.

Personal life
In 1961 Flores married Barbara Fridell, who he met while a student at University of the Pacific. Together, they have twin sons and a daughter, three grandsons, and two granddaughters.

Sanger High School's football stadium is named Tom Flores Stadium in honor of Flores, who was a graduate of Sanger. He heads the Tom Flores Youth Foundation, which benefits the K-8th grades in the Sanger School district in the fields of art, science, and sports. 

Flores graduated from University of the Pacific in 1958. He was the starting quarterback while at Pacific and following his playing career with the Tigers, Flores was hired as an assistant coach at Pacific as he worked toward his master's degree.  

Flores holds an honorary doctorate degree from Pepperdine University for humanitarian service. 

His biography, Fire in the Ice Man, was released in 1992. Flores also coauthored Tales of the Oakland Raiders (2002). 

Flores is still involved with the Raiders for various events.

Awards and honors 
In 1982, Flores was inducted as a charter member of the University of the Pacific Athletics Hall of Fame. In 1988, he was inducted into the Fresno County Athletic Hall of Fame. In 2007, Flores was inducted into the California Sports Hall of Fame. In 2011, he was also inducted into the California Community College Athletic Association Hall of Fame. In July 2011, Flores received the Roberto Clemente Award for Sports Excellence that is given by the National Council of La Raza for contributions in society by an Hispanic athlete. In 2012, he was also inducted into the Bay Area Sports Hall of Fame.
On February 6, 2021, it was announced that Tom Flores would be enshrined into the Pro Football Hall of Fame in Canton, Ohio, joining the Class of 2021 alongside former Raiders player Charles Woodson, Peyton Manning and 5 others.

See also
 List of American Football League players
 List of most consecutive games with touchdown passes in the National Football League
 List of NCAA major college football yearly passing leaders
 List of National Football League head coach wins leaders
 List of Super Bowl head coaches
 List of National Football League head coach wins leaders

References

Sources 
 Flores, Tom. Fire in the Iceman: Autobiography of Tom Flores (Bonus Books; September 1, 1992)

Citations

External links
 

1937 births
Living people
American Football League All-Star players
American Football League players
American football quarterbacks
American sportspeople of Mexican descent
Buffalo Bills coaches
Buffalo Bills players
Fresno City Rams football players
Kansas City Chiefs players
Los Angeles Raiders coaches
Los Angeles Raiders head coaches
National Football League announcers
National Football League general managers
Oakland Raiders announcers
Oakland Raiders coaches
Oakland Raiders head coaches
Oakland Raiders players
Pacific Tigers football players
People from Sanger, California
Players of American football from California
Pro Football Hall of Fame inductees
Seattle Seahawks head coaches
Sportspeople from Fresno, California
Super Bowl-winning head coaches